Pains may refer to:

Medicine
Pain
Suffering
 Pan-assay interference compounds or PAINS in the assay

Places

Brazil
Pains, Minas Gerais
Pains, district of Santa Maria
Pains, Santa Maria

Elsewhere
Pains Hill (disambiguation)
Pains Island, Gulf of Carpentaria, Queensland, Australia

Other uses
Pains (EP), by Islander, 2013

See also
Pain (disambiguation)
Paine (disambiguation)
Payne (disambiguation)